Totally Hits 3 was released on November 14, 2000. The album was the third volume in the Totally Hits series. It reached #25 on the US Billboard 200 album chart. The album contains four Billboard Hot 100 number-one hits: "Music", "Bent", "Everything You Want", and "What a Girl Wants".

Track listing
Madonna – "Music" (Deep Dish Dot Com Radio Edit)
Pink – "Most Girls"
Matchbox Twenty – "Bent"
Vertical Horizon – "Everything You Want"
Third Eye Blind – "Deep Inside of You"
Barenaked Ladies – "Pinch Me"
Faith Hill – "The Way You Love Me (Radio Remix)"
Dido – "Here with Me"
Toni Braxton – "He Wasn't Man Enough"
Christina Aguilera – "What a Girl Wants"
Next – "Wifey"
Debelah Morgan – "Dance with Me"
Joy Enriquez – "Tell Me How You Feel"
Vitamin C – "Graduation"
The Corrs – "Breathless"
Whitney Houston – "Fine"
John Michael Montgomery – "The Little Girl"

Charts

Weekly charts

Year-end charts

Certifications

References

Totally Hits
2000 compilation albums